Lewis Hobba (born 16 June 1985) is an Australian radio presenter, television presenter and comedian.

From 2014 to 2020, he co-hosted the afternoon drive time programme Veronica & Lewis alongside Veronica Milsom on youth radio station Triple J prior to Milsom leaving the station. He is the current co-host of Hobba and Hing alongside comedian Michael Hing on Triple J.

Early life and education
Hobba was born in Melbourne and grew up in Torquay, Victoria. He attended the same high school in Geelong as his Hungry Beast and Triple J Drive co-host, Veronica Milsom. He graduated from RMIT University with a Bachelor of Communication, Media, Film and Television major in 2007 and from Victorian College of the Arts with a Post Graduate Diploma of Film and Television in 2008.

Career
Hobba first appeared on ABC in current affairs comedy programme, Hungry Beast, as a web content producer and presenter. He joined Triple J as co-host of Weekend Breakfast and then Weekend Afternoon alongside Veronica Milsom. In early 2015, Hobba and Milsom moved to the weekday drive time slot (Drive) after Lindsay McDougall left Triple J. He has been a regular contributor on A Rational Fear on FBi Radio and Radio National.

In 2014, he performed his stand-up comedy show, Backs to the Wall, at Sydney Comedy Festival and Melbourne International Comedy Festival.

He has made guest appearances on The Trophy Room, the second iteration of Spicks and Specks, Back Seat Drivers, The Chaser's Media Circus and The Feed.

Discography

Singles

Filmography

Television

Podcasts

Awards and nominations

ARIA Music Awards

! 
|-
! scope="row"| 2019
| "Sex Flex: A Rap Guide to Fornication"
| Best Comedy Release
| 
| 
|}

References

External links
 Profile on Triple J
 

1985 births
Australian radio personalities
Australian male comedians
Australian television presenters
Comedians from Geelong
Living people
RMIT University alumni
Triple J announcers
Victorian College of the Arts alumni